Sirevåg Station is a railway station located at Sirevåg in Hå, Norway on the Sørlandet Line. The station is served by the Jæren Commuter Rail between Stavanger and Egersund. The station was opened in 1879, one year after the Jæren Line. Prior to 1935, the station was called Store Sirevåg.

References

Railway stations on the Sørlandet Line
Railway stations in Hå
Railway stations opened in 1879
1879 establishments in Norway